Hermann Berens (7 April 1826 in Hamburg – 9 May 1880 in Stockholm) was a German-born Swedish Romantic composer famous mainly for his piano music, some of which is included in the Royal Conservatory of Music's Syllabus.

He was the son of a flute player from Germany. One of his popular pieces is Study in A minor, Op. 61, No. 32.

In 2006, the Trio ZilliacusPerssonRaitinen recorded Berens's three string trios, Op. 85, and the recording was released by the Intim Musik label (a Swedish company) in 2007.  The booklet enclosed with the recording includes a detailed biographical note on the composer.

In 1999, Ars Amata Zurich recorded a CD (SUISA 25.818) that contains Berens's String Trio in C minor, Op.86 No.2.

External links

1826 births
1880 deaths
Swedish composers
Swedish classical composers
Swedish male composers
German Romantic composers
German classical pianists
Male classical pianists
Musicians from Hamburg
19th-century classical composers
German male classical composers
19th-century classical pianists
19th-century German composers
German male pianists
19th-century German male musicians